The list of Alpha Phi Alpha brothers (commonly referred to as Alphas) includes initiated and honorary members. Alpha Phi Alpha is the first inter-collegiate Greek-letter organization established for Black college students. Convened in December 1905 as a literary society with the first presiding officer being CC Poindexter, it was established as a fraternity on December 4, 1906, at Ithaca, New York.  Alpha Phi Alpha opened chapters at other colleges, universities, and cities, and named them with Greek letters. Members traditionally pledge into a chapter, although some members were granted honorary status before the fraternity discontinued the practice of granting honorary membership. A chapter name ending in "Lambda" denotes an alumni chapter. The only alumni chapter that does not end in "Lambda" is Rho Chapter, located in Philadelphia, Pennsylvania.

No chapter of Alpha Phi Alpha is designated Omega, the last letter of the Greek alphabet that traditionally signifies "the end". Deceased brothers are respectfully referred to as having their membership transferred to Omega Chapter, the fraternity's chapter of sweet rest. Frederick Douglass is distinguished as the only member initiated posthumously when he became an exalted honorary member of the Omega chapter in 1921.

The fraternity through its college and alumni chapters serves the community through nearly a thousand chapters in the United States, Europe, Africa, Asia, and the Caribbean.

The fraternity has been led by 36 General Presidents. Its membership includes two premiers; four governors; a vice president, four senators; a Supreme Court justice; two presidential candidates; Nobel Prize, Pulitzer Prize, Lenin Peace Prize, Kluge Prize, Golden Globe, Academy Award, Grammy Award, and Emmy Award winners; French Légion d'honneur and Croix de Guerre laureates; at least four Rhodes Scholars; eighteen diplomats; fourteen Presidential Medal of Freedom, seven Congressional Gold Medal, and seventeen Spingarn Medal recipients; and eighteen Olympians. Buildings, monuments, stadiums, arenas, courthouses, and schools have been named after Alpha men, such as the Martin Luther King Jr. Memorial, the Thurgood Marshall Public Policy Building  at the University of Maryland, the Ernest N. Morial Convention Center, the Whitney Young Memorial Bridge, the Jesse Owens Memorial Stadium, the Paul Robeson Plaza at Rutgers University, the Jack Trice Stadium at Iowa State University, the John H. Johnson School of Communication at Howard University, the Oscar W. Ritchie Pan-African Cultural Arts Center at Kent State University, the Arvarh E. Strickland General Classroom Building at the University of Missouri-Columbia, the G. Larry James Memorial Stadium, the Edward W. Brooke Courthouse, the John H. Stroger Cook County hospital, the John Hope Franklin Memorial Plaza in Tulsa Oklahoma, the Stephan P. Mickle, sr. Courthouse, the Ronald V. Dellums Federal Building, the Ralph H. Metcalfe Federal Building, the A. Maceo Smith Federal Building, the Robert F. Smith School of Chemical and Biomolecular Engineering at Cornell University, and the Baltimore-Washington International Thurgood Marshall Airport.

The House of Alpha

The House of Alpha was first published in the December 1923 edition of The Sphinx Magazine. The poem would later be attributed to Bro. Sidney P. Brown quickly became a staple within the fraternity. When speaking about the poem in 1981, Brown cited his experiences with Beta (Washington, D.C.), Theta (Chicago), Xi Lambda (Chicago Alumni), and Eta Lambda (Atlanta Alumni) as collective inspirations for the poem. Loyalty to the Fraternity was repeatedly urged by brothers on the part of those who were among the initiated, and for every chapter with the vision of a fraternity house. The statement has become a manifesto for the national fraternity and chapters, as each may symbolically be referred to as a "House of Alpha".

Eugene K. Jones, sometimes referred to as "The Visionary Jewel", once said:

Here follows a list of notable Alphas.

Founders

Academia

Educators
Ninety-five percent of all Black colleges have been headed by an Alpha.

Scholarship

Rhodes scholars
The Rhodes Scholarship is the world's oldest and arguably most prestigious international fellowship. The scholarships have been awarded to applicants annually since 1902 by the Rhodes Trust in Oxford based on academic qualities, as well as those of character.

Business

Entertainment

Music

Film, television, and theatre

Government, law, and public policy
Note: individuals who belong in multiple sections appear in the first relevant section.

Vice Presidents and Supreme Court

Cabinet and Cabinet-level ranks

Members of the United States Congress

US Governors and Lieutenant Governors

Diplomats

Mayors

Judges and lawyers

Other US political and legal figures

Government officials outside the U.S.

Journalists and media personalities

Literature

Military personalities

Religion

Science
Sixty percent of all Black male doctors and sixty-five percent of all Black male dentists are Alphas.

Service and social reform

Sports

Olympics

American basketball

American football

Other athletics

Other Alphas

General presidents

References

Further reading

External links
 
 Alpha Phi Alpha official site (archived link)
 List of Alpha Phi Alpha chapters

brothers
Lists of members of United States student societies